The 1961–62 Creighton Bluejays men's basketball team represented Creighton University during the 1961–62 NCAA Division I men's basketball season. The Bluejays, led by third year head coach John J. 'Red' McManus, played their home games at the Omaha Civic Auditorium.  They finished the season 21-5.  The Creighton Bluejays earned a bid into the 1962 NCAA Tournament where they defeated Memphis State in the Midwest Region Quarterfinals round before falling in the Midwest Region Semifinals to the #2 ranked, and eventual 1962 National Champion, Cincinnati Bearcats.  The Bluejays defeated Texas Tech in the Midwest Region Third Place game.

Before the season started, Red appeared before the Quarterback Club in Omaha and with his first words stated that Creighton was going to a post season tournament. A majority of the people felt that McManus had a fatal case of over-optimism. The previous year's 8-17 record was far from good.  McManus worked tirelessly to turn Creighton into a basketball power.  He utilized sharp recruiting and tough coaching to put the Bluejays back on the road to fame.  The hard work paid off.  Sophomore Paul Silas would blossom into a force in the middle, leading the nation in rebounding for the 1961–62 and 1962-63 seasons.

Roster

Schedule
 
|-
!colspan=9| Regular Season

|-
!colspan=9| 1962 NCAA Tournament

References

Creighton Bluejays men's basketball seasons
Creighton Bluejays
Creighton
Creighton Bluejays men's bask
Creighton Bluejays men's bask